Lesage is a  census-designated place (CDP) on Ohio River Road in Cabell County, West Virginia, United States. As of the 2010 census, its population was 1,358. It is the nearest community to Clover site, a National Historic Landmark.

Lesage is a part of the Huntington-Ashland Metropolitan Statistical Area (MSA). As of the 2010 census, the MSA had a population of 287,702. New definitions from February 28, 2013 placed the population at 363,000.

The community was named after Jules F. M. LeSage, an early settler.

References

Census-designated places in Cabell County, West Virginia
West Virginia populated places on the Ohio River